Aligarh Muslim University (abbreviated as AMU) is a public central university in Aligarh, India, which was originally established by Sir Syed Ahmad Khan as the Muhammadan Anglo-Oriental College in 1875. Muhammadan Anglo-Oriental College became Aligarh Muslim University in 1920. Many notable individuals have been affiliated with the college as graduates, non-graduating attendees, faculty, staff, or administrators. The following is a list of notable Aligarh Muslim University alumni.

Arts and letters

Literature and journalism

Film and television

Business

Humanities and Social Sciences

Science and Technology

Politics and law

Heads of state and government

Chief ministers and governors

Other politicians, civil servants, and diplomats

Jurists

Religion

Academics

Sports

See also
 List of Chancellors and Vice-Chancellors of Aligarh Muslim University

References

Notes

Citations

External links

 Aligarh Muslim University official website

People by university or college in Uttar Pradesh
Aligarh Muslim University
Uttar Pradesh education-related lists